State Trunk Highway 54 (often called Highway 54, STH-54 or WIS 54) is a Wisconsin state highway running east–west across central Wisconsin.

Route description

Minnesota state line to Plover

WIS 54 begins at the western terminus. It crosses through the Minnesota state line at Winona, Minnesota via the North Channel Bridge. At this bridge, MN 43 ends there. After crossing the bridge, it soon turns east via WIS 35/Great River Road. In Centerville, WIS 35, as well as the Great River Road, turn southward; leaves the concurrency. At the same junction, WIS 93 joins the concurrency eastward. Further east, they then start to run concurrently with US 53 in Galesville. However, as they travel eastward, WIS 54 turns northeast, leaving the concurrency.

At Butman Corners, WIS 54 then turns east again. After leaving Butman Corners, it closely parallels the Black River just south of the route. Then, it meanders eastward towards Melrose. In Melrose, it meets WIS 71/WIS 108 where they end. Continuing north, it continues to parallel the river. In Black River Falls, it briefly runs concurrently with US 12 and WIS 27 on the bridge. After crossing the bridge, WIS 54 becomes a four-lane divided highway. At that point, it no longer follows the river.

Going east, it then meets I-94 at a diamond interchange. After leaving Vaudreuil out northeast, WIS 54 then downgrades into a two-lane undivided highway. Then, it continues going eastward. At Dexterville, WIS 54 briefly traveled southward via WIS 80. Continuing eastward, WIS 54 then runs concurrently with WIS 73 from Port Edward to Wisconsin Rapids. At the start of the concurrency, it, as well as WIS 73, starts to follows the Wisconsin River. In Wisconsin Rapids, WIS 54 turns east, following WIS 13. This concurrency with WIS 13 runs from the west end of the Wisconsin River bridge to 8th Street. WIS 54 then turns north near the city limit. At Robinson Park, WIS 54 curves east, and - passing 64th Street - becomes a four-lane, divided highway with a 65-mph (104 km/h) speed limit to just outside Plover. Although it still closely parallels the river, it is now on the east/south side of the river. At Plover, WIS 54 then turns southeast via Bus. US 51. At that point, it no longer follows the river again.

Plover to Algoma
Continuing southeast, both routes continue to run concurrently until they meet I-39/US 51 interchange. At that point, Bus. US 51 ends there. WIS 54 continues to travel southeast. However, at one point, it then turns east towards Waupaca. At Waupaca, WIS 54 runs concurrently with US 10 as well as WIS 49. At the next interchange out east, WIS 22 joins the concurrency. Just west of the Waupaca Municipal Airport, WIS 54 and WIS 22 leaves the concurrency. After WIS 110, as well as WIS 22, leaves the concurrency, WIS 54 then travels east. Near the Newton Blackmour State Trail in New London, US 45 meets WIS 54 at a parclo. At that point, the route parallels the state trail.

In Shiocton, WIS 76 briefly runs concurrently with WIS 54. East of the concurrency, it intersects WIS 187. In Black Creek, it intersects WIS 47. After WIS 55 turns south, WIS 54 enters the Oneida Reservation. It then turns northeast after intersecting with WIS 172.

After entering Green Bay, WIS 54 becomes a four-lane divided highway. After that, it turns eastward. At the dumbbell interchange, WIS 54 meets I-41/US 41 while WIS 32 runs concurrently with WIS 54. As they get close to downtown, WIS 32 leaves southward while WIS 54 becomes a limited-access road. After crossing a bascule bridge above the Fox River, WIS 54 leaves Mason Street for Monroe Street. At that point, WIS 54 runs concurrently with WIS 57.

In downtown, WIS 29 then briefly joins the concurrency between Walnut Street and Main Street. At Main Street, US 141 intersects with three routes. This is where WIS 29 turns southeast. After crossing that intersection, they then turn southeast and then east. They then meet I-43 at a parclo. After meeting with I-43, the road becomes a freeway. In the middle of it, WIS 54 leaves the freeway. It continues to travel eastward through the Door Peninsula until reaching WIS 42 in downtown Algoma. At that point, WIS 54 ends there.

History
Initially, WIS 54 ran from Green Bay to WIS 17 (now part of WIS 42) in Algona. In 1920, WIS 54 extended westward to WIS 22 in Royalton. In 1924, WIS 54 extended westward to the Mississippi River. This route largely followed its present-day routing. As a result of the extension, it replaced parts of WIS 66 from Wisconsin Rapids to Plover and WIS 52 from Decora Prairie to Black River Falls. By 1931, a portion of WIS 54 between Shiocton and Black Creek was straightened. By 1932, WIS 54 took a different approach to connect to Green Bay from the west. This time, it took Mason Street instead of WIS 29/WIS 32.

Major intersections

See also

References

External links

WIS 54/57 @ Nicolet Dr/University Ave. traffic camera from the Wisconsin DOT

054
Transportation in Buffalo County, Wisconsin
Transportation in Trempealeau County, Wisconsin
Transportation in Jackson County, Wisconsin
Transportation in Wood County, Wisconsin
Transportation in Portage County, Wisconsin
Transportation in Waupaca County, Wisconsin
Transportation in Outagamie County, Wisconsin
Transportation in Brown County, Wisconsin
Transportation in Kewaunee County, Wisconsin